The Great Tang Records on the Western Regions is a narrative of Xuanzang's nineteen-year journey from Chang'an in central China to the Western Regions of Chinese historiography. The Buddhist scholar traveled through the Silk Road regions of what is today Xinjiang in northwest China, as well as neighboring areas in Central Asia and south China. Beyond these Chinese locations, Xuanzang also travelled around the perimeter of India, as far south as Kanchipuram. Xuanzang's travels demarcate not only an important place in cross-cultural studies of China and India, but also cross-cultural studies throughout the globe. The text is set up as both an account of Xuanzang's religious pilgrimage as well as his report of the surrounding towns and provinces of Tang China.

The book was compiled in 646, describing travels undertaken between 626 and 645. Bianji, a disciple of Xuanzang, spent more than one year editing the book through Xuanzang's dictation.

Background 
While trade relations between India and China had been ongoing since 1st century CE and had been strengthened through the introduction of Buddhism into China, it was not until the expansion of the Turkic Khaganate began to threaten the borders of India and China that embassies were sent between the two regions for military alliances. Xuanzang is credited as being one of the first diplomats to establish such a relation between Tang dynasty China and the Indian empire of Kannauj.

Xuanzang's travels were motivated by his deep interest in Buddhist lore. While he was not legally authorized by the Tang court to leave China, he managed to journey to India and record his meetings with kings of various Indian kingdoms. Of particular note is emperor Harsha, whom Xuanzang managed to convince to send an emissary to Emperor Taizong of Tang. These diplomatic relations allowed Xuanzang to return to China without facing legal repercussions, instead granting him an audience with Taizong, who ultimately commissioned Xuanzang to write a record of his journeys to be entered into the official Tang records.

Overview
The book contains more than 120,000 Chinese characters and is divided into twelve volumes, which describe the geography, land and maritime transportation, climate, local products, people, language, history, politics, economic life, religion, culture, and customs in 110 countries, regions and city-states from Xinjiang to Persia, Tajikistan, Uzbekistan, India, and Sri Lanka, among other regions.

Importance
The text is of a great value to modern historians and archaeologists. The Records is an important document of Central Asia during the early seventh century, as it provides information of a Buddhist culture existing in Afghanistan during that time and the earliest textual evidence for Buddhist sculptures at Bamiyan.  His travels are also credited with being partially responsible for the spread of sugar-making technology in medieval China and India. This is significant because sugar plays a crucial role in Buddhist doctrine. The text also has equal importance in the studies of India, and archaeologists have been using it to fill in certain gaps in Indian history. It also allowed historians to locate important sites in India.    The book is known for having "exact descriptions of distances and locations of different places", and has served as a guidebook for the excavation of many important sites, such as Rajagrha, the Temple at Sarnath, Ajanta, the ruins of the Nalanda Monastery in Bihar and the ruins of Vasu Bihar of ancient Pundra City. The text inspired Journey to the West, a Chinese novel published in the Ming Dynasty.

References

Citations

Sources 
 Zhu, Yunqiu and Wang, Lixin. Da Tang Xiyu Ji Zhong De Yinduren Xingxiang (The Image of Indians in the Great Tang Records on the Western Regions). Journal of Shenyang University. 2005.2. p. 98-102. ISSN 1008-9225.
 Tang, Qinfu (2001). History of Chinese Historiography. Taiyuan: Shanxi Education Press. . p. 230-232.
 Xie, Fang, "Da Tang Xiyu Ji" ("Great Tang Records on the Western Regions"). Encyclopedia of China, 1st ed.
 Zhang Xiuping et al. (1993). 100 Books That Influenced China: Da Tang Xiyu Ji. Nanning: Guangxi Renmin Press. . p. 392-398.
 T. C. Kuo and H. M. Chou, "The contribution of Xuanzang's Great Tang Records on the Western Regions to the research of religious culture," 2016 International Conference on Advanced Materials for Science and Engineering (ICAMSE), Tainan, 2016, pp. 322-324.

Translations
 Beal, Samuel (1884). Si-Yu-Ki: Buddhist Records of the Western World, by Hiuen Tsiang. 2 vols. Translated by  Samuel Beal. London. 1884. Reprint: Delhi. Oriental Books Reprint Corporation. 1969. Volume 1 (PDF 21.5 MB) Volume2 (PDF 16.9 MB)
 Beal, Samuel (1911). The Life of Hiuen-Tsiang. Translated from the Chinese of Shaman (monk) Hwui Li by Samuel Beal. London. 1911. Reprint Munshiram Manoharlal, New Delhi. 1973.  Internet Archive (PDF 14.3 MB)
 Julien, Stanislas, (1857/1858). Mémoires sur les contrées occidentales, L'Imprimerie impériale, Paris. Vol.1 Vol.2
 Li, Rongxi (translator) (1995). The Great Tang Dynasty Record of the Western Regions. Numata Center for Buddhist Translation and Research. Berkeley, California. 
  Volume 2
Sen, Tansen. “In Search of Longevity and Good Karma: Chinese Diplomatic Missions to Middle India in the Seventh Century.” Journal of World History, vol. 12, no. 1, 2001, pp. 1–28. JSTOR, JSTOR, www.jstor.org/stable/20078877.

Further reading
Bhat, R. B., & Wu, C. (2014). Xuan Zhang's mission to the West with Monkey King. New Delhi: Aditya Prakashan, 2014.
Jain, Sandhya, & Jain, Meenakshi (2011). The India they saw: Foreign accounts. New Delhi: Ocean Books.

External links
 Da Tang Xiyu Ji "Records from the Regions West of the Great Tang Empire" — Chinaknowledge.de.
 10 part (high quality) documentary Xuanzang's Pilgrimage

Chinese classic texts
Chinese prose texts
Tang dynasty literature
Travel books
7th-century Chinese books
Texts about the history of Buddhism